The first court was established in 1788, the first woman to be awarded a Bachelor of Laws degree graduated in 1903, and the first woman barrister was admitted in 1905. It was not until 1965 that the first woman was appointed to an Australian judicial position. These pioneering Australians have been described as members of the FW2 club or First Woman to club. The list includes positions to which no woman has been appointed . It does not include abolished courts to which no woman was appointed, such as the Commonwealth Industrial Court.

For a list of the first women lawyers see list of first women lawyers (Australia)

Notes

References

women
 
Lists of Australian women